The Karazhanbas Oil Field is an oil field located in Mangystau Province in Kazakhstan. It was discovered in 1984 and developed by CITIC Resources. The oil field is operated and owned by CITIC Resources.

References 

Oil fields of Kazakhstan
Oil fields of the Soviet Union